Bacalar can refer to:

 Bacalar Municipality, Quintana Roo, Mexico
 Bacalar, seat and largest town in Bacalar Municipality
 Bentley Bacalar, a two-seater grand tourer
 Bacalar (phantom island), a phantom island depicted on several early 16th century Portuguese maps
 Băţălar (called Bacalár in Hungarian), village in Bretea Română, Romania